Z 5, also known as Blade, was a  of the Dutch Koninklijke Marine which also served in the British Royal Navy. She served during World War II, escaping to England after the Dutch surrender during the Battle of the Netherlands. She was decommissioned in 1945.

Service history
Z 5 was the first ship of the s to be built in the Netherlands, with the initial Z 1 to Z 4 being built in Germany.

Pre-war service
The Netherlands stayed neutral in World War I and therefore Z 5 did not see action during that conflict.

During this exercise ports in Lithuania, Latvia, Estonia and Finland were visited before returning on 4 August.

From 16 July until 28 July 1928, Z 5 visited Edinburgh together with Hertog Hendrik, O 10,  Z 6 and Z 7.

Between 8 July and 8 August 1929, Z 5 went on exercises in the Baltic with Jacob van Heemskerck, O 10 and Z 6.

From 28 June until 10 July 1930, Z 5 visited Edinburgh together with Jacob van Heemskerck, O 8, O 9, O 10 and Z 7.

Between 1930 and 1931, Z 5 was rebuilt at the Rijkswerf Willemsoord to make her more fitted for duties in the Dutch West Indies. This included her propulsion being changed from three coal and oil stoked boilers to two oil stoked boilers, her torpedo tubes being removed and depth charge throwers and smoke screen machines being fitted. Her seaworthiness was improved as well. Due to all the changes the complement was reduced to 34.

Between 4 May and 20 June 1936, Z 5 went on exercises in the Baltic with Hertog Hendrik, O 9, O 10 and O 11.

World War II
During the early hours of 10 May 1940, Germany launched a surprise attack on the Netherlands as part of the  operation to conquer France. On the same day, Z 5 was ordered to attack German positions in Rotterdam and did so successfully. Z 5 fired upon multiple enemy machine gun nests on the Maas bridges with her 75 mm guns while also successfully hitting German floatplanes with her 12.7 mm machine guns. On 14 May Z 5 set sail for England to avoid capture by the Germans and arrived on 17 May at Portsmouth. She underwent repairs before returning to service on 16 June.

From 16 June Z 5 was assigned to the British 9th Submarine Flotilla, where she was used as an escort for incoming and outgoing submarines and as a target ship. From 18 May 1941 Z 5 performed similar duties for the British 7th and 3rd Submarine flotillas. On 2 March 1942 Z 5 was transferred to the British Royal Navy, while her crew was transferred to the new Dutch destroyer .

In British service Z 5 performed all kinds of assistance and escort duties. Because of the striking, sharp bow, the British soon gave Z 5 the nickname "Razor Blade", before renaming her Blade in May 1943.

On 9 April 1945 the Royal Navy returned Blade to the Royal Netherlands Navy, which struck the ship right away. She was sold to the West of Scotland Shipbreaking Company, where she arrived on 23 October. Scrapping was completed on 20 December.

References

 
 

Z-class torpedo boats
Ships built in Vlissingen
1915 ships